The Presbyterian Church in Korea (HapDongBokUm) was founded by Pastor Jung Sung-Ho in 1984. He also founded the Seoul Seminary in 1981. In 1986 the denomination started the HanRim Educational Institute. Under the leadership of Rev. Jang Sung-Ho and Rev. Byun Dong-Ho the church grew significantly. It has approximately 35,000 members and 272 congregations served by 265 pastors. Ministries are open to women. The Apostles Creed and the Westminster Confession are the standards.

References 

Presbyterian denominations in South Korea
Presbyterian denominations in Asia